Luis Miguel Collantes (born 12 November 1982) is a Peruvian former professional footballer who played as a midfielder.

Career
Born in Miraflores, Collantes played for Universitario, Unión Huaral, Total Clean, Sport Áncash, Cienciano and José Gálvez.

References

1982 births
Living people
Peruvian footballers
Club Universitario de Deportes footballers
Unión Huaral footballers
Total Chalaco footballers
Sport Áncash footballers
Cienciano footballers
José Gálvez FBC footballers
Peruvian Primera División players
Association football midfielders
Footballers from Lima